The Vintage Dolomite is a geologic formation in Pennsylvania. It preserves fossils dating back to the Cambrian period.

Type section 
Named from exposures at a railroad cut at Vintage, Lancaster County, Pennsylvania.

See also

 List of fossiliferous stratigraphic units in Pennsylvania
 Paleontology in Pennsylvania

References

 

Cambrian geology of Pennsylvania
Cambrian southern paleotemperate deposits
Geologic formations of Pennsylvania